The El Charco del Cura reservoir is located along the Alberche river in the municipality of El Tiemblo, Ávila, Spain.

It was built in 1931, designed by E. Becerril and A. Peralba.

Reservoirs in Castile and León